Secret Breakers is a series of fictional books, written by H.L. Dennis. Six books in the series have been released.

Summary
The novels revolve around a team of 3 teenagers, plus multiple others, whom altogether are known as 'Team Veritas', as they try to decode the Voynich Manuscript, while avoiding the Black Chamber who are trying to stop their operation. It is set in modern-day England Each novel revolves around a further development in the decoding. The series is set around England, though a recurring setting is Bletchley Park. 
Imagine the chance to solve the Voynich Manuscript – a puzzle that has truly defeated adults for centuries. And there are Rules that say it is forbidden to even try to solve it. Together with her new friends, Brodie must break the rules to break the code, at every turn facing terrible danger. For someone is watching them – and will even kill to stop them.-Secret Breakers summary

Characters
The series has three main protagonists;

Brodie Bray:
Hunter Jenkins
Tusia Petulova

References

British children's books
Series of children's books
Children's mystery novels